Boden's Boy is a 1923 British romance film directed by Henry Edwards and starring Edwards, Chrissie White, and Francis Lister. It was based on a novel by Tom Gallon.

Cast
 Henry Edwards as Enery Boden 
 Chrissie White as Barbara Pilgrim 
 Francis Lister as David Wayne 
 Henry Vibart as Flower 
 Stephen Ewart as Christopher Pilgrim 
 Judd Green as Swaddell 
 Bob Russell as Tickner

References

External links

1920s romance films
Films directed by Henry Edwards
British black-and-white films
Films based on British novels
British romance films
Hepworth Pictures films
1920s English-language films
1920s British films